Gompholobium simplicifolium is a species of flowering plant in the pea family Fabaceae and is endemic arid part of Western Australia and the Northern Territory. It is an erect or spreading shrub with cylindrical leaves and orange-yellow, pea-like flowers.

Description
Flowering occurs from May to December and the fruit is a cylindrical pod.

Taxonomy
This species was first formally described in 1896 by Ferdinand von Mueller and Ralph Tate, who gave it the name Burtonia simplicifolium in Transactions, proceedings and report, Royal Society of South Australia. In 1987, Michael Crisp changed the name to Gompholobium simplicifolium. The specific epithet (simplicifolium) means "simple-leaved".

Distribution and habitat
This gompholobium grows in sandy soil on dunes and sandplains in the Central Ranges, Dampierland, Gascoyne, Gibson Desert, Great Sandy Desert, Great Victoria Desert, Little Sandy Desert, Pilbara and Tanami biogeographic regions of Western Australia and the Northern Territory.

Conservation status
Gompholobium shuttleworthii is classified as "not threatened" by the Government of Western Australia Department of Biodiversity, Conservation and Attractions.

References

Mirbelioids
simplicifolium
Fabales of Australia
Flora of Western Australia
Flora of the Northern Territory
Plants described in 1896
Taxa named by Ferdinand von Mueller
Taxa named by Ralph Tate